UTC+02:00 is an identifier for a time offset from UTC of +02:00. In ISO 8601, the associated time would be written as 2020-11-08T23:41:45+02:00. This time is used in:

As standard time (year-round) 
Principal cities: Cairo, Pretoria, Cape Town, Johannesburg, Khartoum, Lubumbashi, Kigali, Gaborone, Bujumbura, Manzini, Maseru, Tripoli,  Lilongwe, Maputo, Windhoek, Omdurman, Juba, Lusaka, Harare, Kaliningrad

Africa

Central Africa 

Botswana
Burundi
Democratic Republic of the Congo 
The provinces of Bas-Uele, Haut-Katanga, Haut-Lomami, Haut-Uele, Kasaï, Kasaï Occidental, Kasaï Oriental, Katanga, Lomani, Lualaba, Maniema, Nord-Kivu, Orientale, Sankuru, Sud-Kivu, Tanganyika, Tshopo and Ituri Interim Administration
Egypt
Eswatini
Lesotho
Libya
Malawi
Mozambique
Namibia
Rwanda
South Africa (except Prince Edward Islands)
Sudan
South Sudan
Zambia
Zimbabwe

Europe 

Russia
Northwestern Federal District
Kaliningrad Oblast

As standard time (Northern Hemisphere winter only) 

Principal cities: Kyiv, Bucharest, Athens, Jerusalem, Nicosia, Tallinn, Helsinki, Sofia, Riga, Vilnius, Chisinau, Mariehamn, North Nicosia, Tiraspol

Europe

Eastern Europe 
Most countries observe European Union rule to remove DST.
Bulgaria
Cyprus
Including Northern Cyprus
Estonia
Finland
Greece
Latvia
Lithuania
Moldova
 Including Transnistria
Romania
Ukraine
Except Crimea (occupied by Russia), part of Donetsk and Luhansk regions
United Kingdom
Akrotiri and Dhekelia

Asia

Middle East
Principal cities: Jerusalem, Amman, Beirut, Gaza City
Israel 
Lebanon
Palestine

As daylight saving time (Northern Hemisphere summer only)

Europe 

Principal cities: Berlin, Rome, Paris, Madrid, Warsaw, Prague, Brussels, Copenhagen, Budapest, Amsterdam, Zurich, Barcelona, Belgrade, Stockholm 
Albania
Andorra
Austria
Belgium
Bosnia and Herzegovina
Croatia
Czech Republic
Denmark
France
Germany
Hungary
Italy
Kosovo
Liechtenstein
Luxembourg
Malta
Monaco
Montenegro
Netherlands
North Macedonia
Norway (including Svalbard and Jan Mayen)
Poland
San Marino
Serbia
Slovakia
Slovenia
Spain (Excluding Canary Islands) 
Sweden
Switzerland
Gibraltar (United Kingdom)
Vatican City

Discrepancies between official UTC+02:00 and geographical UTC+02:00

Areas in UTC+02:00 longitudes using other time zones 
Using UTC+03:00
Tanzania
 The western part, including Mwanza and Mbeya
Uganda
Kenya
 The western part, including nation's capital Nairobi
Ethiopia
 The western part, including Nekemte and Jimma
Saudi Arabia
 The northwesternmost part, including Tabuk
Turkey
 Most part in the country, including Istanbul
Ukraine
 Part of Donetsk and Luhansk regions
Belarus
Russia
 The western part, including Saint Petersburg, half of Moscow and Crimea

Using UTC+01:00
North Macedonia (standard time)
 The easternmost part, including Novo Selo and Berovo
Serbia (standard time)
 The very easternmost part, including Pirot
Hungary (standard time)
 The northeasternmost part of Szabolcs-Szatmár-Bereg
Slovakia (standard time)
 The easternmost part of Prešov Region
Poland (standard time)
 The easternmost part, including Białystok
Norway (standard time)
 The eastern part of Troms og Finnmark
 The easternmost part of Svalbard
Chad
 The westernmost part of Ennedi-Est, including Amdjarass
Democratic Republic of the Congo
 The easternmost part of its provinces: 
Nord-Ubangi
Mongala
Tshuapa
Kasaï Province
Angola
 The westernmost part of Moxico Province
Central African Republic
 Haut-Mbomou
 The western part of its prefectures:
Mbomou
Haute-Kotto
Vakaga

Areas outside UTC+02:00 longitudes using UTC+02:00 time

Areas between 7°30' E and 22°30' E ("physical" UTC+01:00) 
From south to north:

South Africa
 The westernmost part, including Cape Town
Botswana
 The western part of the districts:
Kgalagadi
Ghanzi
Ngamiland
Demoratic Republic of the Congo
The very westernmost part of Lualaba Province, Kasaï-Central and Sankuru 
Libya
 The most part in the country, where the nation's capital Tripoli is
Greece (standard time)
 The western part, including Patras and Ioanina
Romania (standard time)
 The westernmost part, including Timişoara
Russia
 Kailingrad Oblast
Lithuania (standard time)
 The westernmost part, including Klaipeda
Latvia (standard time)
 The westernmost part, including Liepāja
Estonia (standard time)
 The westernmost parts of the Saare and Hiiu counties.
Finland (standard time)
 The westernmost part, including Turku

References

External links
 

UTC+02:00